The Roman Catholic Diocese of Bondo is a diocese located in the city of Bondo  in the Ecclesiastical province of Kisangani in the Democratic Republic of the Congo.

History
 March 10, 1926: Established as Apostolic Prefecture of Bondo from Apostolic Vicariate of Western Uélé
 December 2, 1937: Promoted as Apostolic Vicariate of Bondo
 November 10, 1959: Promoted as Diocese of Bondo

Bishops

Ordinaries, in reverse chronological order
 Bishops of Bondo (Latin Rite), below
 Bishop Etienne Ung’eyowun Bediwegi (2008.03.18 -)
 Bishop Philippe Nkiere Keana, C.I.C.M. (1992.11.13 – 2005.07.27)
 Bishop Marcel Bam’ba Gongoa (1980.01.28 – 1992.11.13)
 Bishop Emmanuel Marcel Mbikanye, O.P. (1970.09.01 – 1978.09.20)
 Bishop André Creemers, O.S.Cr. (1959.11.10 – 1970.09.01); see below
 Vicars Apostolic of Bondo (Latin Rite), below
 Bishop André Creemers, O.S.Cr. (1955.01.01 – 1959.11.10); see above
 Bishop Frédéric Marie Blessing, O.S.Cr. (1937.12.02 – 1955.01.01); see below
 Prefect Apostolic of Bondo (Latin Rite), below
 Father Frédéric Marie Blessing, O.S.Cr. (1930.01.09 – 1937.12.02); see above

Coadjutor bishop
Philippe Nkiere Keana, C.I.C.M. (1991-1992)

See also
Roman Catholicism in the Democratic Republic of the Congo

Sources
 GCatholic.org
 Catholic Hierarchy

Roman Catholic dioceses in the Democratic Republic of the Congo
Christian organizations established in 1926
Roman Catholic dioceses and prelatures established in the 20th century
Roman Catholic Ecclesiastical Province of Kisangani